Chester Square is an elongated residential garden square  in London's Belgravia district. It was developed by the Grosvenor family, as were the nearby Belgrave and Eaton Square. The square is named after the city of Chester, the city nearest the Grosvenors' ancestral home of Eaton Hall.

No.32 was used as a backdrop for video accompanying Morrissey's track "Suedehead".

The whole except No.s 80a, 81, 81a, 82, 83 and 83a (so No.s 1–13 and 14–23, 24–32, 37–39, 42–45, 45a, 45b, 65–76 and 77–80, 80a, and 84–88 and the Mews Arch) is listed Grade II for architectural merit.

The (private, communal) gardens are Grade II listed on the Register of Historic Parks and Gardens.

St Michael's Church
The Anglican church of Saint Michael in Chester Square was built in 1844 along with the rest of the square, and consecrated two years later. The Ecclesiologist magazine criticised the opening, saying it was "an attempt - but happily a most unsuccessful one - to find a Protestant development of the Christian styles". The church is in the late Decorated Gothic style, with an exterior of Kentish Ragstone. The architect was Thomas Cundy the younger.

Notable residents
Roman Abramovich, Russian oligarch and former owner of Chelsea FC
Matthew Arnold, poet and critic
Tony Curtis, actor, had a house here when he was filming The Persuaders! in the early 1970s.
Blake Edwards and Julie Andrews, film director and his actress wife, lived here for a few years in the early 1970s after their departure from Hollywood
George II, King of the Hellenes, bought a lease on a house at No. 45 shortly before his return to Greece in 1946
Mick Jagger and Marianne Faithfull, pop musicians, lived here in 1966-67               
Nigella Lawson, celebrity chef and food writer; daughter of Conservative former Cabinet Minister Lord Lawson
Sir John Liddell, doctor and director-general of the Royal Navy medical department, lived at No. 72 until his death in 1868
Yehudi Menuhin, Baron Menuhin, American-born violinist and conductor
Edward Ford, private secretary to Queen Elizabeth II, lived at No. 16 during the 1950s 
Margaret Thatcher, former British Conservative Prime Minister, lived at No. 73 until shortly before her death in 2013
Wilhelmina, Queen of the Netherlands, had her headquarters at No. 77 during the Second World War
Major Conrad Norman, Senior Gunnery Officer Royal Artillery Woolwich, Dunkirk survivor, officer in charge of British coastal gun emplacements in the Second World War, lived at No. 56 from 1946 until 1951
Gideon Mantell, an obstetrician, geologist, and palaeontologist, whose attempts to reconstruct the structure and life of the Iguanodon began the scientific discovery of dinosaurs, lived until his death at No. 19.
 W H Elliott, a broadcaster on religious matters for the BBC, and known as "the Radio Chaplain", was vicar of St Michael's in the mid-20th century.

Footnotes and References
Footnotes

Citations

1828 establishments in England
Grade II listed buildings in the City of Westminster
Grade II listed houses
Grade II listed parks and gardens in London
Squares in the City of Westminster
Belgravia
Garden squares in London
Communal gardens